The Bolshoy Zelenchuk is a river in the North Caucasus, Russia. It is a left tributary of the Kuban into which it flows at Nevinnomyssk.

References

Rivers of Krasnodar Krai
Rivers of Karachay-Cherkessia
Rivers of Stavropol Krai